A touch hole, also called a vent, is a small hole at the rear (breech) portion of the barrel of a muzzleloading gun or cannon. The hole provides external access of an ignition spark into the breech chamber of the barrel (where the combustion of the propellant occurs), either with a slow match (matchlock), a linstock or a flash pan ignited by some type of pyrite- (wheellock) or flint-based gunlock (snaplock, snaphaunce and flintlock), which will initiate the combustion of the main gunpowder charge. Without touch hole, it would be nearly impossible to ignite the powder because the only otherwise access into the barrel is from the front via the muzzle, which is obturated by the projectile. 

In the later caplock firearms, the ignition sparks are generated by a shock-sensitive percussion cap placed over a conical "nipple", which has a hollow conduit known as the flash channel, that leads into the barrel and serves the same function as the touch hole.

In modern breechloading firearms, the propellant charge is packaged inside a cartridge, which has a modified percussion cap (primer) seated in a cavity at the back end of the cartridge case.  Between the primer pocket and the case chamber are one or more apertures known as flash holes, which serves functionally as a touch hole inside the cartridge.

In artillery, priming powder, a fuse, squib, or friction igniter is inserted into the touch hole to ensure ignition of the charge.  The ignition might be achieved via striking or electrically.

Spiking the guns

Spiking a gun was a method of temporarily disabling a cannon by hammering a barbed steel spike into the touch hole; this could be removed only with great difficulty. If a special spike was unavailable, spiking could be done by driving a bayonet into the touch-hole and breaking it off, to leave the blade's tip embedded. Guns could also be rendered useless by burning their wooden carriages or blowing off their trunnions.

Count Friedrich Wilhelm von Bismarck, in his Lectures on the Tactics of Cavalry, recommended that every cavalry soldier carry the equipment needed to spike guns if an encounter with enemy artillery was expected. If a cannon was in danger of being captured by the enemy, its crew would spike the gun to prevent it from being used against them. Captured guns would be spiked if they could not be hauled away and the gun's recapture seemed likely. Covert missions to spike the enemy's guns could also be done to prevent counterattacks and protect ships during withdrawal, as in the case of the Ranger's attack on Whitehaven during the American Revolutionary War.

References

Firearm components
Articles containing video clips